Parachela williaminae is a species of cyprinid in the genus Parachela. It inhabits Thailand, Cambodia and Laos. It has been assessed as "least concern" on the IUCN Red List and is considered harmless to humans.

References

Cyprinid fish of Asia
IUCN Red List least concern species
Fish of Thailand
Fish of Cambodia
Fish of Laos
Cyprinidae